The Code is a collaborative studio album by rappers Young Noble of Outlawz & Deuce Deuce of Concrete Mob. It was released on April 25, 2016, on Concrete Enterprises. It is their second collaborative album their first one Fast Life was released in 2013.

Track listing

References

External links 
 OutlawzMedia.net Official Website
 
 
 
 
 
 

2016 albums
Young Noble albums
Collaborative albums